Senator Pitcher may refer to:

Fred B. Pitcher (1867–1924), New York State Senate
Perley A. Pitcher (1877–1939), New York State Senate